The men's 56 kg boxing event at the 2015 European Games in Baku took place between 16 and 25 June.

Results

References

Men 56